St. George Greek Orthodox Church is a Greek Orthodox church building in Asmara. It was established in 1903 by the Greek trader community.

References

Churches in Asmara
Greek Orthodox churches
Eastern Orthodoxy in Eritrea
Christian buildings and structures in Eritrea